Camille Van Marcke (born 25 March 1884, date of death unknown) was a Belgian racing cyclist. He rode in the 1919 Tour de France.

References

1884 births
Year of death missing
Belgian male cyclists
Place of birth missing